Abodh Bandhu Bahuguna (15 June 1927 – 2004) was a Hindi and Garhwali writer and poet. He is known for his poems, epics, plays, folk-literature, and essays.

Biography
Bahuguna was born in Jhala village, Chalaansyun, Pauri, Garhwal in what is presently Uttarakhand. He completed his Masters (M.A.) education in Hindi and Political Science from Nagpur University, served in the Uttar Pradesh State Service and retired as Deputy Director, Government of India. Bahuguna was a prolific writer and continued freelance writing after his retirement from his professional life.

Selected publications 
Garhwali Language
 Bhumyal
 Parvati
 Ghol
 Daisat
 Kankhila
 Gaad
 Myateki Ganga
 Shailvani

Hindi Language
 Dadga Hridaya
 Aranya Rodan
 Chakrachal
 Doobta Hua Gaon

Awards 
Abodh Bandhu Bahuguna received 2 awards from the Uttar Pradesh government and was also honoured with the Jai Shree Samman.

References 

1927 births
2004 deaths
Indian poets
Indian writers